Paruima is an indigenous village of Pemon Amerindians in the Cuyuni-Mazaruni Region of Guyana. The village was founded as a mission of the Seventh-day Adventist Church. It is the only Pemon speaking community in Guyana.

Overview
Reverend A.W. Cott of the Seventh-day Adventist Church was a missionary among the Pemon people in Venezuela. In 1930, Cott was expelled from Venezuela, and decided to settle in Paruima in Guyana together with his fellow missionaries, and Amerindian converts.

Paruima has a primary school, and a health centre. In 2017, the school was destroyed when the river flooded. It has been rebuilt in 2019. It is also home to the Paruima Mission Academy, a college for missionaries. The main access is by air via the Paruima Airport.

The toshao (village chief) as of 2017 is Lee Williams. Williams first ran for toshao in 1997 at the age of 19. Twenty years later, he was elected. In 2020, Williams was also elected to the National Assembly.

Nature

The Oshi Falls are located near the village. The Oshi Falls are one of the tallest waterfalls of Guyana. A permit from the Office of Indigenous Affairs is required to visit the falls.

In January 2021, a new species of orchid from the tepuis in the Guiana Highlands was identified and described by Eric Hágsater, a Mexican botanist, and Mateusz Wrazidlo, a Silesian explorer. Wrazidlo asked the family of Calio Elliman, his guide from Paruima, to name the plant. Elliman opted for "katarun yariku" (Pemon for "high flower"). The orchid has been officially named Epidendrum katarun-yariku.

References

Indigenous villages in Guyana
Populated places in Cuyuni-Mazaruni